The 22nd District of the Iowa Senate is located in southern Iowa, and is currently composed of Dallas and Polk Counties.

Current elected officials
Sarah Trone Garriott is the senator currently representing the 22nd District.

The area of the 22nd District contains two Iowa House of Representatives districts:
The 43rd District (represented by Jennifer Konfrst)
The 44th District (represented by Kenan Judge)

The district is also located in Iowa's 3rd congressional district, which is represented by Cindy Axne.

Past senators
The district has previously been represented by:

Merlin Hulse, 1983–1984
Beverly Hannon, 1985–1992
Patrick Deluhery, 1993–2002
Larry McKibben, 2003–2008
Steve Sodders, 2009–2012
Charles Schneider, 2013–2021
Sarah Trone Garriott, 2021–present

See also
Iowa General Assembly
Iowa Senate

References

22